Carabus babao is a species of ground beetle in the large genus Carabus.

References

babao
Insects described in 2007